Rybníky may refer to:

 Rybníky (Příbram District), a village in the Czech Republic
 Rybníky (Znojmo District), a village in the Czech Republic